Fernanda Barbosa Takai (born 25 August 1971) is a Brazilian singer, better known as the lead vocalist and rhythm guitarist of rock band Pato Fu. She has also been working on a solo career since 2007.

In 2011, she collaborated with Atom™, Toshiyuki Yasuda and Moreno Veloso on the track "Águas de Março" for the Red Hot Organization's most recent charitable album Red Hot+Rio 2. The album is a follow-up to the 1996 Red Hot + Rio. Proceeds from the sales will be donated to raise awareness and money to fight AIDS/HIV and related health and social issues.

Life and career
Born in Serra do Navio, Amapá, Takai was raised in Belo Horizonte, Minas Gerais. She is half Portuguese descent from her mother's side and half Japanese descent from her father's side. Since the year 2007, she's been working on a solo career, but hasn't left Pato Fu.

In 2021, her album Será Que Você Vai Acreditar? was nominated for the Latin Grammy Award for Best Portuguese Language Contemporary Pop Album.

Discography

Pato Fu 
 Rotomusic de Liquidificapum (1993)
 Gol de Quem? (1994)
 Tem Mas Acabou (1996)
 Televisão de Cachorro (1998)
 Isopor (1999)
 Ruído Rosa (2001)
 Toda Cura para Todo Mal (2005)
 Daqui Pro Futuro (2007)
 Música de Brinquedo (2010)
 Não Pare Pra Pensar (2014)

Solo 
 Onde Brilhem os Olhos Seus (2007) (Brazil: 60,000)
 Luz Negra (2009) (Brazil: 20,000)
 Fundamental (2012) (with Andy Summers) (Brazil: 10,000)
 Na Medida do Impossível (2014) (Brazil: 10,000)
 O Tom da Takai (2018) (Brazil: 5,000)

Guest appearances 
 Herbert Vianna – O Som do Sim (2000)
 Various – Um Barzinho, um Violão: Jovem Guarda (2005)
 Various – Renato Russo - Uma Celebração Multishow - Ao Vivo (2006)
 Clã – Cintura (album) (2007)
 Various – Um Barzinho, Um Violão - Novela 70 (2008)
 Projecto Fuga – 01 (2008)

References

External links
 Official website
 Official Pato Fu website

1971 births
Living people
People from Amapá
Brazilian musicians of Japanese descent
Brazilian people of Portuguese descent
Brazilian women guitarists
Brazilian women singer-songwriters
Brazilian composers
Brazilian women writers
Brazilian rock musicians
Rhythm guitarists
21st-century Brazilian women singers
21st-century Brazilian singers
21st-century guitarists
Women in Latin music
21st-century women guitarists